Oba Adesimbo Victor Kiladejo Adenrele Ademefun Kiladejo, or Jilo III, was appointed the 44th Osemawe, or traditional ruler of the Ondo Kingdom in Nigeria on 1 December 2006. He was crowned on 29 December 2008 at a ceremony attended by dignitaries including the Ondo State Governor, Olusegun Agagu, the Ooni of Ife, Oba Okunade Sijuade, and the leader of Afenifere, Chief Reuben Fasoranti.

Kiladejo was born in Ondo City, the eldest of the twenty-two children of Prince Gbadebo Adedoyin Kiladejo, Edilokun of the Okuta Ruling House. He attended the University of Ife, now Obafemi Awolowo University, earning a B.Sc. in health sciences, Bachelor of Medicine and Bachelor of Surgery. He went on to the University of Liverpool for post-graduate studies in reproductive health.
After his Youth Corp Service, he started work at the Ondo State Health Management Board, rising to the position of medical director.  He left to establish his private practice, Kiladejo Hospitals Group in Ikere Ekiti, and later branched out into other businesses.

Kiladejo was crowned on 29 December 2008 as the third Osemawe of Ondo to come from the Jilo line of Okuta Ruling House, the second being Arojojoye Oba Pupa, who ruled from 1926 to 1935. The Okuta house descends from Oba Luju, who reigned between 1561 and 1590 and was a son of the first Ondo ruler, Oba Pupupu. 
After his accession, Kiladejo introduced computerization into administration of the kingdom, promoted health among his subjects, and established committees to resolve security issues and land disputes.

References

Living people
Yoruba monarchs
People from Ondo City
Nigerian traditional rulers
Ondo State
Obafemi Awolowo University alumni
Alumni of the University of Liverpool
Nigerian healthcare managers
Yoruba physicians
Year of birth missing (living people)
Yoruba people
People from Ondo State